ExoClick is a Barcelona-based online advertising company, which provides online advertising services to both advertisers and publishers all over the world via web, mobile, tablet and smart TV.  ExoClick's customers include advertisers, advertising agencies, traffic distribution partners and publishers.

History

ExoClick was founded in December 2006, as an online project by current CEO Benjamin Fonzé. The first version of the ExoClick self-service ad system appeared online a few months later. ExoClick immediately opened the service to the international market.

During summer 2011, the company opened its office in the Torre Mapfre skyscraper situated in Barcelona (Spain). By 2011, it was among the top 500 in Alexa traffic rankings and BuiltWith listed ExoClick as the 2nd fastest growing advertising technology in the world.

In 2012, the company incorporated mobile advertising into its ad network. ExoClick grew rapidly and by 2014, the company was serving 4 billion daily impressions, more than 125 billion per month (both web and mobile) and W3Techs ranked it the 5th biggest ad network in the world.

In 2015, ExoClick was ranked 4th largest ad network in the world by W3Techs.

In January 2016, ExoClick broke through the barrier of 5 billion daily ad impressions. The company also received two business accolades: it ranks at no. 812 in the 2016 Inc. 5000 Europe list of the fastest-growing private companies in Europe and ExoClick won the Ruban d’Honneur award for ‘The Business of the Year with a Turnover of €26150 million at the 20152016 European Business Awards.

In April 2017, ExoClick was ranked at 523 in the Financial Times 1000 Fastest Growing European Companies 2017.

In August 2017, ExoClick launched its Ad Exchange.

In July 2018, ExoClick launched The Bidder, an automatic optimisation tools for advertisers and affiliates.

As of 2021, ExoClick is serving over 10 billion daily impressions.

References

External links
Official website

Online advertising services and affiliate networks